Captain from Toledo is a 1965 Italian-Spanish-German adventure film written and directed by Eugenio Martín and starring   Stephen Forsyth and Ann Smyrner. Set in medieval Toledo, Spain, the Italian film critic Marco Giusti described it as a crossover between Eurospy and swashbuckler genres.

Plot

Cast

 Stephen Forsyth  as  Captain Miguel de Fuentes
 Ann Smyrner as Doña Rosita
 Norma Bengell  as Myriam
  Gianni Solaro as  Don Pedro
 Maria Laura Rocca as Doña Sol
  Gabriella Andreini as Cafat
 Nerio Bernardi  as Don Alfonso
 José Calvo  as Don Canio
  Aldo Cecconi as Don Raphael
 Ivan Desny  as Don Felipe
 Carl Möhner  as Don Ramiro
 Manolo Gómez Bur  
  Andrea Scotti as Carlos
 Rosy Zichel as Aixa

References

External links
 

1965 films
1965 adventure films
Spanish adventure films
Italian adventure films
West German films
1960s Italian-language films
Films set in the 1480s
Films set in Toledo, Spain
Italian swashbuckler films
1960s Italian films